The men's 20 kilometres race walk at the 1974 European Athletics Championships was held in Rome, Italy, on 3 September 1974.

Medalists

Results

Final
3 September

Participation
According to an unofficial count, 21 athletes from 12 countries participated in the event.

 (1)
 (1)
 (3)
 (2)
 (1)
 (3)
 (1)
 (3)
 (2)
 (2)
 (1)
 (1)

References

20 kilometres race walk
Racewalking at the European Athletics Championships